Toddy palm is a common name for several species of palms used to produce palm wine, palm sugar and jaggery. Species so used and named include:
Arenga pinnata, the areng palm
Borassus flabellifer, the palmyra palm
Caryota, the fishtail palms
Cocos nucifera, the coconut
Nypa fruticans, the nipa palm

See also
Sugar palm

Fermented drinks
Edible palms
Tree tapping
Non-timber forest products